Ch'utu Qullu (Aymara ch'utu peak of a mountain, top of the head, qullu mountain, also spelled Chutu Khollu) is a  mountain in the Bolivian Andes which reaches a height of approximately . It is located in the La Paz Department, Loayza Province, Luribay Municipality, southeast of Janchallani.

References 

Mountains of La Paz Department (Bolivia)